Sowlan or Sulan or Sowlon or Sulon may refer to:
 Sulan, Ardabil (صولان)
 Sulan, Hamadan (صولان)
 Sowlan, Jiroft (صولان), Kerman Province
 Sowlan, Qaleh Ganj (صولان), Kerman Province
 Sulan, Sistan and Baluchestan (سولان)
 Sulan, Chabahar (صولان), Sistan and Baluchestan Province

In fiction
Sulan is a Vidiian character in "Faces (Star Trek: Voyager)"